The Cry of the Wild Geese (German: Ruf der Wildgänse) is a 1961 Austrian historical drama film directed by Hans Heinrich and starring Ewald Balser, Heidemarie Hatheyer and Brigitte Horney.

The film's sets were designed by the art director Leo Metzenbauer. It was shot at the Rosenhügel Studios in Vienna and on location in Manitoba in Canada.

Cast
 Ewald Balser as Caleb Gare 
 Heidemarie Hatheyer as Amelia Gare 
 Brigitte Horney as Mrs. Sandbo 
 Marisa Mell as Judith Gare 
 Horst Janson as Sven Sandbo 
 Gertraud Jesserer as Ellen Gare 
 Hans H. Neubert as Mark Jordan

See also
Wild Geese (1927)

References

Bibliography 
 Bock, Hans-Michael & Bergfelder, Tim. The Concise CineGraph. Encyclopedia of German Cinema. Berghahn Books, 2009.

External links 
 

1961 films
1961 Western (genre) films
1960s German-language films
Films directed by Hans Heinrich
Films shot in Manitoba
Films shot at Rosenhügel Studios
UFA GmbH films
Films set in the 1880s
Films set in Manitoba
1960s historical drama films
Austrian historical drama films
Austrian Western (genre) films
Films based on Canadian novels
Remakes of American films